Jack Heaton may refer to:

 John Heaton (athlete) (1908–1976), known as Jack, American bobsledder and skeleton racer
 Jack Heaton (rugby union) (1912–1998), rugby union international for England